Cyperus nervulosus is a sedge of the family Cyperaceae that is native to Australia.

It blooms between February and July and produces green-brown flowers.

In Western Australia it is found around swamps and pools in the Kimberley region where it grows in sandy-clay soils.

See also
List of Cyperus species

References

Plants described in 1940
Flora of Western Australia
nervulosus